Wu Po-chen (born 23 July 1966) is a Taiwanese judoka. He competed in the men's half-lightweight event at the 1988 Summer Olympics.

References

1966 births
Living people
Taiwanese male judoka
Olympic judoka of Taiwan
Judoka at the 1988 Summer Olympics
Place of birth missing (living people)
20th-century Taiwanese people